Cnephasia genitalana is a butterfly belonging to the family Tortricidae. The species was first described by Pierce and Metcalfe in 1915.

It is native to Europe and Northern America.

References

genitalana